Filipinki were the first Polish all-girl vocal group and also Poland's leading female band of the 1960s.

Career
Filipinki were founded in October 1959 at an economic college in Szczecin and became popular in Poland through exposure at music festivals and other events during the years that followed. They named themselves after popular teen girl magazine Filipinka.

By 1963, they were well-established but the big breakthrough came with their Wala Twist, a playful song celebrating female cosmonaut Valentina Tereshkova, who became the first woman into space aboard Vostok 6 in June 1963. Wala Twist quickly became a hit in Poland and the Soviet Union. In the same year Filipinki released their first EP vinyl record in the Soviet Union and two more EPs in Poland. Just in 1964 their Polish EPs sold over 704,740 copies (N-0298: 353,240 copies and N-0299: 351,500 copies). The group became extremely popular both domestically and in all countries of the Eastern Bloc, becoming one of the first teen musicians acts to appear regularly on Polish, Soviet Union and GDR television programs. In the mid-1960s they were called The Beatles Girls by Polish media.

In 1965, Filipinki became first Eastern Bloc young musicians to tour overseas, in Canada and the United States. They performed concerts, among others, in the cities: Toronto, Ottawa, Montreal, New York City, Minneapolis, Chicago, Detroit, Pittsburgh, Philadelphia and Baltimore. They returned to America in 1966 for the next three-month tour. Filipinki also released three vinyl records in Canada and the US; two LPs and one EP.

In 1968, Filipinki reduced the group from seven to five vocalists, changed their image and revamped as a rock band.

The group disbanded in November 1974 after a 15-year run. Their success made it possible for future Polish teenage musicians and girl bands to find mainstream success.

Discography

Bibliography

In November 2013, a biography of the band by Marcin Szczygielski entitled We are Filipinki! Illustrated History of First Polish Girlsband was released in Poland.

Notes

External links

Filipinki in Library of Polish Songs

Musical groups established in 1959
Musical groups disestablished in 1974
All-female bands
Polish girl groups
Beat groups
Psychedelic pop music groups
Polish women singers
Polish jazz ensembles
Polish pop music groups
Polish folk groups
Polish rock music groups
1959 establishments in Poland